Martin Rennie is a Scottish football coach, who was most recently the manager of Scottish League One side Falkirk.

Early life
Born in Thurso, Scotland to Fiona and Cliff Rennie on 22 May 1975, Martin Rennie spent the first 10 years of his life in Bettyhill where his father was a Church of Scotland minister. In 1985, Rennie's father accepted a call to the Old Parish Church, in Larbert and the family moved there. Rennie was schooled at Ladeside Primary, and Larbert High School, at weekends he would watch Falkirk F.C. play, later becoming a ballboy for the team.

Rennie went on to study for a business degree at Glasgow Caledonian University. In his final year, he received a tryout for the Charlotte Eagles but suffered a cruciate ligament injury to his right knee.
Returning to Scotland, Rennie continued to play for Scottish Junior Football Association teams Dunipace and Bo'ness whilst working in sales and marketing for Blackbaud. With the money earned from his sales and marketing work, Rennie was able to personally pay for his SFA coaching course costs. Rennie quickly rose through the coaching ranks and attained his UEFA 'A' Licence becoming assistant manager at Rosyth F.C. at 26.

In 2003 Rennie was asked by charity Ambassadors Football to embark on a playing tour of Africa, visiting, Mozambique, Sudan and South Africa. The tour comprised players from United States-based teams Charlotte Eagles, Cascade Surge, and Minnesota Thunder, a South Africa international, a Nigeria international and several players from the UK. During the trip, Rennie was offered an opportunity to manage the Cascade Surge.

Coaching career

Cascade Surge
Rennie took over as head coach with the Cascade Surge in Oregon, in 2005. Under him the Premier Development League team reached its best level of success during its existence between 1995 and 2009. In his only season in charge Rennie led the Surge to the North West Division Title, West Coast Championship Final, US Open Cup Qualification and the Fair Play Award. Out of 16 games, the Surge won 12 games, and drew 2. Following this success Rennie had to return to his work with Blackbaud, and began to make plans for full-time work with AIS. In 2006 Rennie accepted an invitation to become a director of AIS, as well as head coach of both USL-2 expansion team, the Cleveland City Stars and youth team Ambassadors FC (both owned by AIS).

Cleveland City Stars
In the club's first season, the City Stars lost only one regular season game. Rennie won the coach of the year award in a season where the team conceded a USL all-time record low of 13 goals. The team finished its first season as the runners up in the USL Second Division.

The Cleveland City Stars won the 2008 United Soccer Leagues Championship with a 2–1 victory over the Charlotte Eagles in front of a sold-out crowd at Krenzler Stadium in Cleveland and live to a TV audience throughout the United States. Again Rennie's work was recognized in the shape of the coach of the year award. Some of the top young players that Rennie had recruited and coached in 2007 were transferred to professional teams at a higher level before the 2008 season began. Once again at the end of the 2008 season some of the most talented players were recruited by MLS and European teams.

Carolina RailHawks
Rennie began to coach the Carolina RailHawks from USL 1. With the Carolina RailHawks he inherited a team that had only made the playoffs once in the history of the Franchise and had never finished above eighth place in a regular season campaign. Rennie only kept 3 players from the previous RailHawks roster. He then completely changed the team culture and environment, introducing psychological, tactical and physical concepts that had never been implemented at this level before. In 2009 the team missed out on the regular season title by only 2 points finishing runners up to Portland who recorded one of the best regular season records in the 25-year history of the USL. Rennie was finalist for the coach of the year award and his team was recognized for the turnaround that had taken place in just one season.

In 2010, the RailHawks established themselves as arguably the premier team in US Soccer outside of MLS. The RailHawks won the NASL title and continued their success into the post season with a run to the Championship final. the team that had previously never scored a playoff goal. For the fourth year in a row Rennie was recognized as a finalist for the Coach of the Year Award, a feat that had never been achieved before at this level of professional soccer. The RailHawks also broke franchise records for a single season including conceding only 14 goals and scoring 54.

Rennie attributes much of his coaching success to the leadership and psychological lessons he learned during his career in the corporate world as well as the support he has had from assistant coaches Brian Irvine and Paul Ritchie, both former Scotland national football team players.

Vancouver Whitecaps FC
On 9 August 2011, Rennie was announced as the new coach of Vancouver Whitecaps FC, however he did not assume that role until after the season was over, on 2 November 2011. At the end of the 2011 season Rennie revamped his playing squad by introducing experienced imports from the Scottish and English football league systems — Kenny Miller, Barry Robson and Andy O'Brien — then in his first season in charge the Whitecaps reached the play-offs. In the process Rennie became the first coach to lead a Canadian team to the MLS post season.

In the 2013 season Rennie continued to revamp the playing squad, reduced the age of the team and introduced young players like Kekuta Manneh to the Whitecaps lineup as well as Premier League experience in former England U21 international Nigel Reo-Coker. The Whitecaps became known throughout MLS for their attacking and entertaining style. On 29 October, with his side finishing 3 points short of making the play-offs Rennie was fired from the Whitecaps after their most successful MLS season to date where they finished on 48 points, 5 more than the previous season. The Whitecaps also won the 2013 Cascadia Cup and won more games than they lost for the first season in their history. Bob Lenarduzzi, president of the Whitecaps cited inconsistent performances and tactics as well as a failure to win the Canadian Championship as reasons for his dismissal.

Seoul E-Land
On 17 July 2014, he was appointed as manager of newly formed South Korean side Seoul E-Land FC who were scheduled to join K League Challenge in the 2015 season. On 11 September 2014, he officially joined Seoul E-Land FC.

Working with primarily young Korean players, Rennie gave 18 players their professional debut and led the team to the playoffs in their inaugural season. Rennie and Seoul E-Land parted ways on 15 June 2016.

Indy Eleven
On 16 January 2018, American club Indy Eleven announced Rennie as head coach ahead of their inaugural United Soccer League (USL) season. On 16 June 2021 Indy Eleven and Martin mutually agreed to part ways.

Falkirk 
On 10 December 2021, Rennie would return to his native Scotland, being announced as the new manager for Scottish League One side Falkirk. Rennie left Falkirk in April 2022.

Managerial record

References

External links
 
 Vancouver Whitecaps FC bio
 

1974 births
Living people
Alumni of Glasgow Caledonian University
North Carolina FC coaches
Cleveland City Stars coaches
Scottish footballers
Scottish football managers
USL First Division coaches
Expatriate soccer managers in the United States
Expatriate football managers in South Korea
Scottish expatriate sportspeople in the United States
Scottish expatriate sportspeople in South Korea
Sportspeople from Thurso
Vancouver Whitecaps FC coaches
Bo'ness United F.C. players
Dunipace F.C. players
Seoul E-Land FC managers
Indy Eleven coaches
North American Soccer League coaches
Association footballers not categorized by position
Scottish Junior Football Association players
Scottish expatriate football managers
USL League Two coaches
Notre Dame Fighting Irish women's soccer coaches
Falkirk F.C. managers
Scottish Professional Football League managers